Magaram Israpilovich Magomedov (born May 20, 1966) is a Russian grandmaster since 1998 and an international master since 1992. His highest rating was 2608 (in July 2000).

He played for Tajikistan at the 1994, 1996 and 1998 Olympiads.

He wrote a book called 4.Nc3 a6 - A Strange-looking Move.

References

Chess grandmasters
Russian chess players
Russian people of Tajikistani descent
Chess Olympiad competitors
1966 births
Living people